Riff is an American R&B and soul a cappella group from Paterson, New Jersey. The group RIFF appeared in the 1989 biographical-drama film, Lean on Me starring Morgan Freeman as the 'Songbirds' in the bathroom scene. They recorded two albums in the 1990s. Three of the members (Anthony Fuller, Dwayne Jones, and Michael Best) joined Men of Vizion but have since returned and the group has re-formed with two new members. They are still performing and making songs.

Members
Current members
Michael Best
Steven Capers
Anthony Fuller
Kenny J. Wilkins

Former members
Kenny "Damn" Kelly (December 24, 1969 – July 31, 2016)
Dwayne Jones
Delvis Damon
André Lamar

Discography

Albums
Riff (SBK, 1991) US #177, US R&B #41
To Whom it May Concern (ERG, 1993)

Singles

References

External links
Riff interview
Riff Facebook
Riff Twitter
Riff YouTube
Riff Reverbnation

American rhythm and blues musical groups
Musical groups from New Jersey